4seven (commonly stylised as 47) is a British free-to-air television channel which was launched on 4 July 2012 at 7.00 pm. According to Channel 4, it was created in response to its viewers demanding Channel 4 to broadcast old programming from the network. Its programming focuses on Channel 4's top rated programmes.

4seven launched with 20 hours of content in the schedule per day. In the 8.00 pm and 10.00 pm slots the channel broadcasts a repeat of shows from the previous day that have created a critical buzz in newspapers, chatter on social media through Twitter and Facebook and reaction on the overnight log of comments kept by the broadcaster. The 11.00 pm slot is used to repeat the programme shown on Channel 4 at 9.00 pm, which air again on 4seven at 9.00 pm the following day. The rest of the programmes on 4seven are repeats of the most popular ones of the week. Weekends are devoted to multiple repeats of the best-rated programmes of the past seven days.

History
The service was originally reported under the working title of 'Project Shuffle', though it was announced on 8 March 2012, that the name would be '4seven'. The channel was originally set to launch by June 2012, however it was subsequently reported to be launching later in the summer. On 22 May 2012, it was confirmed that 4seven would launch on 4 July 2012.

The channel launched across all major TV platforms in the UK, with agreements in place for carriage on Freeview, Freesat, Sky, and Virgin TV. The channel indirectly replaced the temporary More4 +2 on Sky. While on Freeview, a placeholder for 4seven appeared on channel 47 in post-digital switchover areas on 2 April 2012.

A high-definition simulcast, 4seven HD, launched on 1 July 2014 on Freeview channel 111. 4seven HD was added to Virgin Media in November 2016. It closed on 22 June 2020 on Freeview to help make room on COM7 following the closure of COM8. 4seven HD is currently exclusive to Virgin Media and Sky Glass.

On 4 November 2020, the channel moved to channel 48 on Freeview as part of a move up where every channel from channel 24 to 54 on the platform moved up one place to allow BBC Four to move to channel 24 in Scotland due to new Ofcom rules regarding certain PSB channels requiring greater prominence on EPGs. This is because the BBC Scotland channel is on channel 9 in Scotland, whilst BBC4 is on channel 9 in the rest of the UK.

Former logos

File:RANDOX Logo

See also
 List of television stations in the United Kingdom

References

External links 
 

Channel 4 television channels
Television channels in the United Kingdom
Television channels and stations established in 2012
2012 establishments in the United Kingdom